Jerrel Wijks (born 15 March 1998) is a Surinamese professional footballer who plays as a midfielder for SVB Eerste Divisie club Inter Moengotapoe and the Suriname national team.

Club career 
Wijks made a single appearance for Portmore United, coming on as an 83rd minute substitute in the first game week of the 2018–19 National Premier League on 16 September 2018. The match ended in a 2–1 win for Mount Pleasant Academy. However, Portmore United would go on to win the title.

International career 
Wijks made his debut for Suriname in a 3–0 win over the Cayman Islands on 24 March 2021. He came on as a substitute at the 87th minute of the match.

Honours 
Inter Moengotapoe

 Caribbean Club Shield runner-up: 2018
 Caribbean Club Championship runner-up: 2021

Portmore United
National Premier League: 2018–19

References

External links 
 

1998 births
Living people
Surinamese footballers
Association football midfielders
Inter Moengotapoe players
Portmore United F.C. players
National Premier League players
Suriname international footballers
Surinamese expatriate footballers
Surinamese expatriate sportspeople in Jamaica
Expatriate footballers in Jamaica